Mohna is one of the famous villages of Jhanjharpur in Mithila region. Mohna is a village of Simra panchayat. It is surrounded with three main villages, Simra panchayat (Majhaura, Simra, Maheshpura) as well as Kanhauli. Famous festivals are Durga puja and Ram navami.
 
NH 57 is the main road which connects Mohna from Darbhanga and Patna of Bihar and silliguri of West Bengal. This National Highway is also known as the East- West Corridor. The length of this corridor is about 3,214 km. It starts from Porbandar(Gujrat) and ends at Silchar (Assam).

References

Villages in Madhubani district